The Canaveral National Seashore (CANA) is a National Seashore located between New Smyrna Beach and Titusville, Florida, in Volusia and Brevard Counties. The park, located on a barrier island, was created on January 3, 1975, by an act of Congress. The park is split between Brevard and Volusia counties, with 9 miles of the seashore in Brevard County, and 15 miles of the seashore in Volusia County. CANA consists of 24 miles of beaches, dunes, mangrove wetlands, and a large portion of the Mosquito Lagoon. The Canaveral National Seashore is also the longest expanse of undeveloped land along the East Coast of Florida. The Canaveral National Seashore is home to more than 1,000 plant species and 310 bird species. CANA occupies  (including lagoons). There are 3 major beach sections in the seashore. The southern section is Playalinda Beach, the middle section is Klondike Beach, and the northern section is Apollo Beach.

History
In 1955, plans were drafted to declare a national park in a 9,000 acre portion of the present day location after a National Park Service survey. To see this through, a committee dedicated to forming a national park was formed in Volusia County. On April 26, 1968, the Volusia County Board of Commissioners passed Resolution No. 68-51 requesting the Department of the Interior to establish a National Seashore on the east coast of Volusia County, Florida. In 1968, William "Bill" Chappell was elected to the U.S. House of Representatives. During his first year in office, Chappell promised the chamber that the seashore project would be one of his top priorities. He kept his word and on April 5 and 6, 1974, Congressman Roy Taylor, chairman of the house subcommittee on National Parks and Recreation, brought a congressional party to review the proposed site. A second group, including chairman of the Senate National Parks and Recreation Committee, Senator Alan Bible, visited on April 19. By this time, the original planned 9,000 acres had grown to 35,000. Things then began to progress quickly. The House passed the Seashore Act on December 3, as did the Senate on December 17. After 10 years of perseverance, the chamber realized its goal to establish Canaveral National Seashore when President Gerald Ford signed his approval on January 3, 1975. Local artist and environmentalist Doris Leeper was instrumental in the creation of the park.

Recreation
The John F. Kennedy Space Center is located at the southern end of the barrier island occupied by Canaveral National Seashore, so access to the seashore is often restricted during launch-related activities at the space center. The Playalinda Beach has 13 parking lots numbered from the south. NASA's Launch Complex 39B and SpaceX's Launch Complex 39A are easily visible from the approach of the Parking Lot 1 as well as most of the beach. Playalinda is usually a popular location for the public get a close viewing of launches from Kennedy Space Center and Cape Canaveral Space Force Station. Although space is limited and viewing areas are pushed back depending on the launch.

The seashore also is home to 2 nude beaches. Nudists frequent Apollo beach between parking lot 5 on the New Smyrna side, and parking lot 13 for Playalinda Beach on the Titusville side. Nudity is legal in the seashore's Volusia County sections past parking lot 5, but is illegal in the Brevard County sections. Those who wish to sunbathe or swim nude on Playalinda are supposed to walk about a mile North on the beach to enter the Volusia County section of Playalinda, though the law is sporadically enforced, and Playalinda has a reputation of being a clothing-optional beach.

Fishing and hunting are extremely popular in the seashore. On the beaches, anglers target species such as pompano, whiting, bluefish, and sharks. On the Mosquito Lagoon side of the seashore, there are a few fishing piers accessible from the roads. Shoreline anglers target species such as speckled trout, redfish, sheepshead, black drum and mangrove snapper. Over 2/3 of the entire seashore consists of the Mosquito Lagoon, and there are several kayak and motorboat launches that are located within the seashore. Hunters often launch from the seashore to enter the neighboring Merritt Island Wildlife Refuge during hunting season, as hunters are allowed to hunt waterfowl, deer, and wild pigs on specific days of the week in portions of the seashore and the refuge during hunting season. A few popular waterfowl targets are Canada goose, teal duck, and wood duck.

Gallery

See also
 Eldora, Florida
 Old Haulover Canal
 Ross Hammock Site
 Seminole Rest
 Turtle Mound

References

External links

 
 National Park Service: Canaveral National Seashore
 scheduled closing (e.g. for rocket launches)

Atlantic Coast barrier islands of Florida
Protected areas of Brevard County, Florida
National Seashores of the United States
Parks in Brevard County, Florida
Protected areas of Volusia County, Florida
Protected areas established in 1975
National Park Service areas in Florida
Beaches of Brevard County, Florida
Beaches of Volusia County, Florida
Beaches of Florida
Islands of Brevard County, Florida
Islands of Volusia County, Florida
Islands of Florida
1975 establishments in Florida